The Chinese Taipei women's national under-16 and under-17 basketball team is the national basketball team representing the Republic of China on Taiwan in international competitions for Junior Women, governed by the Chinese Taipei Basketball Association (CTBA).
It represents the country in international under-16 and under-17 women's basketball competitions.

See also
Chinese Taipei women's national basketball team
Chinese Taipei women's national under-19 basketball team
Chinese Taipei men's national under-17 basketball team

References

under-17
national
Women's national under-17 basketball teams